Prestonia parvifolia is a species of plant in the family Apocynaceae. It is endemic to Ecuador.  Its natural habitat is subtropical or tropical dry forests. It is threatened by habitat loss.

Habitat
Ecology: A vine or liana of dry coastal semi-deciduous forest(0–500 m).

References

External link 
 zipcodezoo.com

Flora of Ecuador
parvifolia
Critically endangered plants
Taxonomy articles created by Polbot